The Czech Statistical Office is the main organization which collects, analyzes and disseminates statistical information for the benefit of the various parts of the local and national governments of the Czech Republic. It accomplishes this goal through the management of the Czech Statistical Service.

History
The Czech Statistical Office can trace its history back to the communist era in 1969, when it was created by the Act of the Czech National Council No. 2/1969.  It has existed continuously since, although its remit changed somewhat over time.  It was reauthorized by the current Czech Republic in 1995. However, in the years between 1969 and 1995, some control over statistical matters had gradually passed to local governments. Thus, while the basic provisions of the modern CSO were brought into effect on 15 June 1995, the authorizing legislation allowed until 1 January 1996 for complete control over statistics throughout the Republic to be exercised by the CSO.

References

External links

Government agencies of the Czech Republic
National statistical services